Euxoa robiginosa is a moth of the family Noctuidae. It is found in Turkey, Iraq, northern and south-western Iran, Lebanon, Israel and Jordan.

Adults are on wing in October. There is one generation per year.

External links
 Noctuinae of Israel

Euxoa
Moths of Asia
Moths of the Middle East
Moths described in 1895